Robert "Killer" Kyle (September 24, 1913 – June 18, 2010) was an American football and minor league baseball player, as well as a college football and cross country coach. He served as the head football coach at Concord University in Athens, West Virginia from 1948 to 1950. A quarterback at West Virginia University, Kyle also played one season of baseball for the Greensburg Red Wings in 1936.

References

1913 births
2010 deaths
American football quarterbacks
Concord Mountain Lions football coaches
Greensburg Red Wings players
West Virginia Mountaineers football players
College cross country coaches in  the United States
Sportspeople from Grimsby